Liptovský Hrádok is a town in northern Slovakia, in the region of Liptov.

History
First mentioned in 1341,  Liptovský Hrádok was named after the nearby castle. The castle, also known as Liptovský Hrádok, was built originally for use of the forestry commission, hunters of the area and the Catholic Church. The castle was later modified and furnished in the style of Louis XVI. The name of the town and the castle literally means "little castle of Liptov". A salt processing facility was constructed in 1728 to collect salt for the Solivar Salt Works which now is part of Prešov, a Slovak city further to the East. This helped Liptovský Hrádok rise to some prominence in the region. The population centre of the town was the main street, which runs from the castle to the south continuing along to the Váh River and the hamlet of Prekážka.

Geography and climate
The region of Liptovský Hrádok is bordered by the Low Tatras to the south and partially bordered by the West and High Tatras. The town is situated in the middle of the Liptov Basin created by the Váh River. It is in the centre of northern Liptov and lies on the confluence of the rivers Váh and Belá. The average altitude of the town is 637 meters above sea level. Rainfall is very frequent in this part and the weather often changes quickly. Snowfall stays on the ground approximately 140 days during the year.

Facts about Liptovský Hrádok:

 Liptovsky Hradok had 731 inhabitants in 1869 and currently (in 2012) has 7,454 inhabitants. 
 Area of the town: 1.832 ha.
 Dovalovo is its town section with 1001 inhabitants
 Average yearly temperature: .
 Maximum temperature: 
 Minimum temperature: 
 Absolute maximum:  (16.08.1952)
 Absolute minimum:  (11.02.1929)
 Length of sunshine: 140 days per year
 Average rainfall per year 691 mm
 Average number of cold days year: 160.4 days
 Average number of summer days per year: 28.9 days

Cityscape and architecture
https://web.archive.org/web/20160304034943/http://az-europe.eu/data/albumy/GEO_PANORAMA/3848/panorama.jpg

Drawing of Thomas Ender: http://2.bp.blogspot.com/_EdtSm1CwIPA/Rg6D-XjU47I/AAAAAAAAAQA/wTqLSdSWKuo/s400/0710lipt+hradok.jpg

Castle and manson with lakelet/pond: https://web.archive.org/web/20160304090630/http://www.nasliptov.sk/image.php?url=files%2Fvylety%2F37.jpg&width=451&height=270&fit

Viem from high peak Skalka at Hradná Street: https://web.archive.org/web/20140429195230/http://visitliptov.sk/hlp-image/800x532/userdata/dtb/3271/profil//skalka.jpg

View at the part of "Limewood Alley" (Lipová alej) created in 1777: https://web.archive.org/web/20140430022911/http://visitliptov.sk/userdata/dtb/3293/profil/arboretum.jpg

Internal part of the Castle in winter: http://i.sme.sk/cdata/9/62/6278479/hlavna.jpg

Demographics
According to the 2001 census, the town had 8,232 inhabitants. 97.11% of inhabitants were Slovaks, 1.37% Czechs, 0.72% Roma and 0.15% Hungarians. The religious make-up was 42.23% Lutherans, 31.74% Roman Catholics and 21.14% people with no religious affiliation.

Twin towns – sister cities

Liptovský Hrádok is twinned with:
 Česká Skalice, Czech Republic
 Hradec nad Moravicí, Czech Republic
 Nowy Targ, Poland
 Stary Sącz, Poland

References

External links

 Official website

Cities and towns in Slovakia
Villages and municipalities in Liptovský Mikuláš District